The Poster Boy were a Hungarian indie rock band from Budapest, Hungary. The band's line-up was Imre Poniklo from the Budapest-based indie-rock band Amber Smith, Noel R. Mayer from the alternative rock band, The Walrus, and Michael Zwecker from the Pécs-based alternative rock band Kispál és a borz. The band members decided to form a band while chatting about the Hungarian indie scene in a bar in Budapest. In a couple of months they wrote several songs which were recorded in late 2011.

History

Things We Had Time For
On 19 January 2012, The Poster Boy released Things We Had Time For which is a song cycle. The album was recorded by Eszter Polyák and some bits by We Are Rockstars and The Puzzle singer-songwriter György Ligeti. The mastering was completed at the Abnormal studios in Pesterzsébet, Hungary. The band asked Vivek Chugh to come up with a cover. The album was available on the band Bandcamp site. The band doesn't strive to reinvent music; only to write and record good songs.

Melody
On 14 July 2012, the band's physical debut album, Melody, was released by Firestation Records in Berlin and Bell Boy Productions in Barcelona. The idea came from Serge Gainsbourg's Histoire de Melody Nelson. The CD features three new tracks (Melody, Only A Test and It's Over) as well as six tracks from Things We Had Time For. The full album was available on the band's Bandcamp site for download. Only A Test and Melody were recorded at the Abnormal Studios and were mixed by György Ligeti. The cover art was made by Esther Olóndriz. The band invited Zsolt Derecskei to play the keys on Only A Test and to sing on Melody.

Bonjour, C'est Pop Deux
On 28 March 2013, Imre Poniklo played one new song from the second studio album of the band in acoustic evening at the Hunnia Bisztró, in Budapest.

On 8 November 2013, the song Snap, Crackle POP was aired on the radio station of University of Oregon.
On 15 November 2013, The Poster Boy presented their new album at Kuplung in Budapest.

In spring 2014 the album won Fonogram prize in the best Pop-rock album category.

On the Count of Three
On 23 May 2017 The Poster Boy have released their third, and final album,"On the Count of Three", according to Hungarian music blog Recorder. 

The record has been produced by György Ligeti, recorded by the band with bass player Zoltán Fehér, among feature appearances by Dorina Galambos, Szilárd Balanyi, Barna Pély and Ádám Iliás. Due to differences and tensions undisclosed, the band stopped working together.

Discography

Albums
 Things We Had Time For (2012)
 Melody (2012)
 Bonjour, C'est Pop Deux (2012)
 On the count of three (2017)

See also
Budapest indie music scene

References

External links
Official site

Musical groups established in 2011
Musical groups disestablished in 2017
Hungarian indie rock groups
English-language singers from Hungary
2011 establishments in Hungary